Lynn-Holly Johnson is an American retired figure skater and actress. After achieving some success as a figure skater in the mid-1970s, she began an acting career, including a Golden Globe-nominated role in 1978's Ice Castles and her role as Bibi Dahl in the 1981 James Bond film For Your Eyes Only.

Early life and career
Johnson was born Lynn Holly Johnson in Chicago, Illinois, to Margaret, a housewife, and Alan Johnson, a general contractor. She has a brother, Gregg, and an older sister, Kimberlee. Johnson added the hyphen to her name after her roommate signed Johnson's name that way. She graduated from Niles North High School in Skokie, Illinois.

Johnson won the silver medal at the novice level of the 1974 U.S. Figure Skating Championships. She gave up competitive skating in 1977 to turn professional and join the Ice Capades, and subsequently began an acting career, making her film debut in Ice Castles, in which she portrayed Alexis "Lexie" Winston, a figure skater who is blinded by a blood clot in her brain. The film, a romantic drama co-starring Robby Benson, was a minor success in December 1978, grossing $18 million in the US. Johnson, who was described as "an appealing young woman who actually happens to be a good skater who can act" by film critic Roger Ebert, was nominated for a Golden Globe as "Golden Globe Award for New Star of the Year – Actress" for her performance in the film.

Johnson was subsequently cast in the lead role of the Disney horror drama The Watcher in the Woods. The film received a limited release in April 1980, but it was soon withdrawn and not given a wider release until October 1981. Also in 1981, Johnson had a minor supporting role as Bibi Dahl in the James Bond movie For Your Eyes Only; the character's name is a pun on the endearing term "baby doll" as well as likely being an homage to Roald Dahl, who wrote the screenplay for the 1967 Bond movie You Only Live Twice. In For Your Eyes Only, she played yet another figure skater who has a crush on James Bond, played by Roger Moore. In 1984, Johnson starred in Where the Boys Are '84, a remake of the 1960 film of the same name. The film was a critical and box-office failure.

In 1996, Johnson quit acting to concentrate on her family; her last acting role at that time was a made-for-television film, Fugitive X: Innocent Target.

In 2007, she returned to acting in a community theater production of It's a Wonderful Life.

Personal life
Johnson currently lives with her husband and their two children in Los Angeles, California. In January 2010, Johnson suffered a stroke while on a flight from Florida to Los Angeles. Upon medical intervention, Johnson learned that the stroke had been brought on by a patent foramen ovale, a congenital heart defect that had gone undiagnosed. She subsequently underwent open heart surgery to treat the condition.

Johnson's daughter, Jensie, is a competitive gymnast and a member of the Alabama Crimson Tide gymnastics team.

Filmography

Awards and nominations

References

External links
 Official website
 
  (October 16, 1998)
 Lynn Holly Johnson interview (August 2012)
 Lynn Holly Johnson Interview

Actresses from Chicago
American film actresses
American female single skaters
American television actresses
Living people
20th-century American actresses
21st-century American actresses
People with congenital heart defects
Year of birth missing (living people)